The Quorum may refer to:

The Quorum (magazine), a British homosexual magazine of which a single issue appeared in 1920
The Quorum (coffee house), a New Orleans coffee house known as a model for multicultural exchange in the 1960s

See also 
 The Quorum of the Twelve, a governing body in some Latter Day Saints churches